What follows is a list of events in chronological order that affected the membership of the Quorum of the Twelve Apostles of the Church of Jesus Christ of Latter-day Saints.

1830s
 14 February 1835  Quorum of the Twelve Apostles is organized. Oliver Cowdery, Martin Harris, and David Whitmer choose the first 12 members. Lyman E. Johnson, Brigham Young and Heber C. Kimball ordained.
 15 February 1835  Orson Hyde, David W. Patten, Luke S. Johnson, William E. McLellin, John F. Boynton and William Smith ordained.
 21 February 1835  Parley P. Pratt ordained.
 25 April 1835 Thomas B. Marsh ordained.
 26 April 1835  Orson Pratt ordained.
 2 May 1835  Thomas B. Marsh sustained as President of the Quorum of the Twelve
 3 September 1837  John F. Boynton disfellowshipped. He was excommunicated later that year.
 13 April 1838  Lyman E. Johnson and his brother, Luke S. Johnson excommunicated.
 11 May 1838  William E. McLellin excommunicated.
 25 October 1838  David W. Patten killed in Battle of Crooked River.
 19 December 1838  John E. Page and John Taylor ordained.
 17 March 1839  Thomas B. Marsh excommunicated.
 26 April 1839  Wilford Woodruff and George A. Smith ordained.
 4 May 1839  William Smith and Orson Hyde removed from the Quorum by vote of the church.
 25 May 1839  William Smith restored to Quorum by vote of the Church.
 27 June 1839  Orson Hyde restored to the Quorum by vote of the church.

1840s
 14 April 1840  Willard Richards ordained in England. Also the first occasion where Brigham Young was formally sustained President of the Quorum of the Twelve Apostles
 8 April 1841  Lyman Wight ordained.
 20 August 1842  Orson Pratt excommunicated. Amasa M. Lyman ordained.
 20 January 1843  Orson Pratt rebaptized and restored to former office in the Quorum. Amasa M. Lyman replaced.
 4 February 1843  Amasa M. Lyman made a Counselor to First Presidency.
 27 June 1844  Joseph Smith and Hyrum Smith martyred. Amasa M. Lyman retires from First Presidency.
 12 August 1844  Amasa M. Lyman returned to the Quorum.
 6 October 1845  William Smith dropped from Quorum. He was excommunicated 19 October 1845.
 9 February 1846  John E. Page disfellowshipped. He was excommunicated on 27 June 1846
 16 July 1846  Ezra T. Benson ordained.
 27 December 1847  The First Presidency is reorganized, with Brigham Young President, Heber C. Kimball First Counselor, and Willard Richards Second Counselor. Orson Hyde becomes President of the Quorum.
 3 December 1848  Lyman Wight excommunicated.
 12 February 1849  Charles C. Rich, Lorenzo Snow, Erastus Snow, and Franklin D. Richards ordained.

1850s
 11 March 1854  Willard Richards dies.
 7 April 1854  Jedediah M. Grant ordained an Apostle and set apart as a counselor to Brigham Young.
 1 December 1856  Jedediah M. Grant dies.
 4 January 1857  Daniel H. Wells ordained an apostle and set apart as a counsellor to Brigham Young.
 13 May 1857  Parley P. Pratt is assassinated.

1860s
 26 August 1860  George Q. Cannon ordained.
 4 February 1864  Brigham Young, Jr. ordained an apostle, but not a member of the Quorum.
 John Willard Young ordained an apostle, but not a member of the Quorum.  (Set apart as counselor to Brigham Young in 1867, and to Twelve in 1877.)
 Joseph Angell Young ordained an apostle, but not a member of the Quorum.
 1 July 1866  Joseph F. Smith ordained and simultaneously set apart Counselor to President Brigham Young.
 6 October 1867  Amasa M. Lyman deprived of apostleship. He was excommunicated on 12 May 1870.
 8 October 1867  Joseph F. Smith was sustained as a member of the Quorum of the Twelve. (He was previously ordained an apostle.)
 22 June 1868  Heber C. Kimball dies.
 7 October 1868  George A. Smith set apart First Counselor to President Brigham Young.
 9 October 1868  Brigham Young, Jr. sustained as a member of the Quorum of the Twelve. (He was previously ordained an apostle.)
 April 1869  Brigham Young, Jr. moved ahead Joseph F. Smith in seniority. (He was previously the junior member of the quorum.)
 3 September 1869  Ezra T. Benson dies.

1870s
 3 July 1870  Albert Carrington ordained.
 8 April 1873  Brigham Young, Jr., Albert Carrington, John Willard Young and George Q. Cannon set apart as Counselors to President Brigham Young.
 9 May 1874  George Q. Cannon set apart Assistant Counselor to President Brigham Young. Albert Carrington set apart Counselor to President Brigham Young.
 10 April 1875  Orson Hyde and Orson Pratt are moved down in seniority in the Quorum due to earlier apostasy, putting them in the places they would be had they entered the Quorum at the time of their reinstatements. John Taylor becomes President of the Quorum.
 5 August 1875  Joseph Angell Young dies. He had never been a member of the First Presidency and was never added to the Quorum of the Twelve.
 1 September 1875  George A. Smith dies.
 8 October 1876  John Willard Young set apart as First Counselor to Brigham Young.
 29 August 1877  Brigham Young dies.
 28 November 1878  Orson Hyde dies.
 7 April 1879  Moses Thatcher ordained.

1880s
 10 October 1880  The First Presidency is reorganized with John Taylor President, George Q. Cannon First Counselor, and Joseph F. Smith Second Counselor. Wilford Woodruff becomes President of the Quorum.
 27 October 1880  Francis M. Lyman and John Henry Smith ordained.
 3 October 1881  Orson Pratt, the last surviving member of the original quorum, dies.
 16 October 1882  George Teasdale and Heber J. Grant ordained.
 17 November 1883  Charles C. Rich dies.
 9 April 1884  John W. Taylor ordained.
 7 November 1885  Albert Carrington excommunicated.
 25 July 1887  John Taylor dies.
 27 May 1888  Erastus Snow dies.
 7 April 1889  The First Presidency is reorganized with Wilford Woodruff President, George Q. Cannon First Counselor, and Joseph F. Smith Second Counselor. Lorenzo Snow becomes President of the Quorum.
 7 October 1889  Marriner W. Merrill, Anthon H. Lund, and Abraham H. Cannon ordained.

1890s
 13 November 1893  William Smith dies.
 6 April 1896  Moses Thatcher is not sustained by the church and dropped from the Quorum.
 19 July 1896  Abraham H. Cannon dies.
 7 October 1896  Matthias F. Cowley and Abraham O. Woodruff ordained. 
 2 September 1898  Wilford Woodruff dies.
 13 September 1898  The First Presidency is reorganized with Lorenzo Snow President, George Q. Cannon First Counselor, and Joseph F. Smith Second Counselor. Franklin D. Richards becomes President of the Quorum.
 10 October 1898  Rudger Clawson ordained.
 9 December 1899  Franklin D. Richards dies. Brigham Young Jr. becomes de facto President of the Quorum, but not published or presented to the church.

1900s
 31 March 1900 In a meeting of the First Presidency, George Q. Cannon is given the opportunity to choose between remaining in the First Presidency, or being released and becoming President of the Quorum of the Twelve.  He chooses to stay in the First Presidency, leaving the question of seniority between Brigham Young Jr. and Joseph F. Smith unresolved until the following day.
 1 April 1900 In a combined meeting of the First Presidency and Quorum of the Twelve Apostles, seniority is unanimously changed to be based on entry into the Quorum of the Twelve instead of date of ordination, ensuring George Q. Cannon and Joseph F. Smith's seniority to Brigham Young Jr.
 8 April 1900  Reed Smoot ordained.
 12 April 1901  George Q. Cannon dies. 
 10 October 1901  Lorenzo Snow dies. Joseph F. Smith becomes President of the Quorum.
 17 October 1901  The First Presidency is reorganized with Joseph F. Smith as president, John R. Winder as First Counselor, and Anthon H. Lund Second Counselor. Brigham Young, Jr. becomes quorum president.
 24 October 1901  Hyrum M. Smith ordained.
 January 1903  Reed Smoot elected to the U.S. Senate.
 11 April 1903  Brigham Young, Jr. dies. Francis M. Lyman becomes President of the Quorum.
 8 October 1903  George Albert Smith ordained.
 20 June 1904  Abraham O. Woodruff dies.
 7 July 1904  Charles W. Penrose ordained.
 28 October 1905  John W. Taylor and Matthias F. Cowley resign.
 6 February 1906  Marriner W. Merrill dies.
 9 April 1906  George F. Richards, Orson F. Whitney, and David O. McKay ordained.
 20 February 1907  A motion to remove Reed Smoot from the U.S. Senate is defeated. (See Smoot Hearings)
 9 June 1907  George Teasdale dies.
 6 October 1907  Anthony W. Ivins ordained.
 21 August 1909  Moses Thatcher dies.

1910s
 27 March 1910  John R. Winder, First Counselor in the First Presidency, dies.
 7 April 1910  Joseph F. Smith reorganizes First Presidency. Anthon H. Lund set apart as First Counselor, and John Henry Smith as Second Counselor. Joseph Fielding Smith ordained.
 13 October 1911  John Henry Smith dies.
 7 December 1911  Charles W. Penrose set apart as Second Counselor to President Joseph F. Smith.
 8 December 1911  James E. Talmage ordained.
 18 November 1916  Francis M. Lyman dies.
 23 November 1916  Heber J. Grant becomes President of the Quorum.
 18 January 1917  Stephen L. Richards ordained.
 23 January 1918  Hyrum M. Smith dies.
 7 April 1918  Richard R. Lyman ordained.
 19 November 1918  Joseph F. Smith dies.
 23 November 1918  The First Presidency is reorganized, with Heber J. Grant President, Anthon H. Lund First Counselor, and Charles W. Penrose Second Counselor. Lund becomes President of the Quorum.
 7 January 1919  Melvin J. Ballard ordained.

1920s
 2 March 1921  Anthon H. Lund dies. Rudger Clawson becomes President of the Quorum.
 10 March 1921  Charles W. Penrose set apart as First Counselor in the First Presidency, Anthony W. Ivins as Second Counselor to Heber J. Grant.
 17 March 1921  John A. Widtsoe ordained.
 16 May 1925  Charles W. Penrose dies.
 28 May 1925  Anthony W. Ivins set apart as First Counselor to Heber J. Grant, with Charles W. Nibley as Second Counselor.

1930s
 16 May 1931  Orson F. Whitney dies.
 8 October 1931  Joseph F. Merrill ordained.
 11 December 1931 Charles W. Nibley dies.
 1932  Reed Smoot loses the election for the U.S. Senate.
 6 April 1933  J. Reuben Clark called as Second Counselor in the First Presidency to Heber J. Grant, but is not an apostle.
 27 July 1933  James E. Talmage dies.
 12 October 1933  Charles A. Callis ordained.
 23 September 1934  Anthony W. Ivins dies.
 11 October 1934  J. Reuben Clark and Alonzo A. Hinckley ordained. Clark set apart as First Counselor, with David O. McKay as Second Counselor in the First Presidency to Heber J. Grant.
 22 December 1936  Alonzo A. Hinckley dies.
 8 April 1937  Albert E. Bowen ordained.
 6 April 1938  Sylvester Q. Cannon ordained an apostle, and set apart as an Associate to the Twelve.
 30 July 1939  Melvin J. Ballard dies.
 6 October 1939  Sylvester Q. Cannon becomes a member of the Quorum.

1940s
 9 February 1941  Reed Smoot dies.
 10 April 1941  Harold B. Lee ordained.
 29 May 1943  Sylvester Q. Cannon dies.
 21 June 1943  Rudger Clawson dies. George Albert Smith becomes President of the Quorum.
 7 October 1943  Spencer W. Kimball and Ezra Taft Benson ordained.
 12 November 1943  Richard R. Lyman excommunicated.
 20 April 1944  Mark E. Petersen ordained.
 14 May 1945  Heber J. Grant dies.
 21 May 1945  The First Presidency is reorganized, with George Albert Smith as president, J. Reuben Clark as First Counselor, and David O. McKay as Second Counselor. George F. Richards becomes President of the Quorum.
 11 October 1945  Matthew Cowley ordained.
 21 January 1947  Charles A. Callis dies.
 10 April 1947  Henry D. Moyle ordained.

1950s
 8 August 1950  George F. Richards dies. David O. McKay becomes President of the Quorum.
 5 October 1950  Delbert L. Stapley ordained.
 4 April 1951  George Albert Smith dies.
 9 April 1951  The First Presidency is reorganized, with David O. McKay as president, Stephen L. Richards as First Counselor, and J. Reuben Clark as Second Counselor. Joseph Fielding Smith becomes President of the Quorum.
 11 October 1951  Marion G. Romney ordained.
 3 February 1952  Joseph F. Merrill dies.
 10 April 1952  LeGrand Richards ordained.
 29 November 1952  John A. Widtsoe dies.
 9 April 1953  Adam S. Bennion ordained.
 15 July 1953  Albert E. Bowen dies.
 8 October 1953  Richard L. Evans ordained.
 13 December 1953  Matthew Cowley dies.
 8 April 1954  George Q. Morris ordained.
 11 February 1958  Adam S. Bennion dies.
 10 April 1958  Hugh B. Brown ordained.
 19 May 1959  Stephen L. Richards dies.
 12 June 1959  J. Reuben Clark is called as First Counselor to David O. McKay. Henry D. Moyle is called as Second Counselor.
 15 October 1959  Howard W. Hunter ordained.

1960s
 22 June 1961  Hugh B. Brown set apart as an additional counselor in the First Presidency to David O. McKay.
 5 October 1961  Gordon B. Hinckley added to the Quorum.
 6 October 1961  J. Reuben Clark dies.
 12 October 1961  Henry D. Moyle set apart as First Counselor in the First Presidency, with Hugh B. Brown as Second Counselor to David O. McKay.
 23 April 1962  George Q. Morris dies.
 11 October 1962  N. Eldon Tanner ordained.
 18 September 1963  Henry D. Moyle dies.
 4 October 1963  Hugh B. Brown sustained as First Counselor in the First Presidency, with N. Eldon Tanner as Second Counselor to David O. McKay.
 4 October 1963  Thomas S. Monson added to the Quorum.
 28 October 1965  Thorpe B. Isaacson called as an additional counselor in the First Presidency to David O. McKay.
 29 October 1965  Joseph Fielding Smith called as an additional counselor in the First Presidency to David O. McKay.
 5 October 1967  Alvin R. Dyer ordained but not added to Quorum.
 6 April 1968  Alvin R. Dyer called as an additional counselor in the First Presidency to David O. McKay.

1970s
 18 January 1970  David O. McKay dies.
 23 January 1970  The First Presidency is reorganized, with Joseph Fielding Smith as president, Harold B. Lee as First Counselor, and N. Eldon Tanner as Second Counselor. Lee becomes President of the Quorum, with Spencer W. Kimball as Acting President.
 6 April 1970  Boyd K. Packer added to the Quorum.
 1 November 1971  Richard L. Evans dies.
 2 December 1971  Marvin J. Ashton ordained and added to the Quorum.
 2 July 1972  Joseph Fielding Smith dies.
 7 July 1972  The First Presidency is reorganized, with Harold B. Lee as president, N. Eldon Tanner as First Counselor, and Marion G. Romney as Second Counselor. Spencer W. Kimball becomes President of the Quorum.
 12 October 1972  Bruce R. McConkie added to the Quorum.
 26 December 1973  Harold B. Lee dies.
 30 December 1973 The First Presidency is reorganized, with Spencer W. Kimball as president, N. Eldon Tanner as First Counselor, and Marion G. Romney as Second Counselor. Ezra Taft Benson becomes President of the Quorum.
 6 April 1974  L. Tom Perry added to the Quorum.
 2 December 1975 Hugh B. Brown dies.
 8 January 1976  David B. Haight ordained.
 5 March 1977  Alvin R. Dyer dies. Although Dyer was an ordained Apostle, he was never a member of the Quorum.
 19 August 1978  Delbert L. Stapley dies.
 30 September 1978  James E. Faust added to the Quorum.

1980s
 23 July 1981  Gordon B. Hinckley called as an additional counselor in the First Presidency. Neal A. Maxwell ordained.
 27 November 1982  N. Eldon Tanner dies.
 2 December 1982  Marion G. Romney set apart as First Counselor in the First Presidency. Gordon B. Hinckley set apart as Second Counselor.
 11 January 1983  LeGrand Richards dies.
 11 January 1984  Mark E. Petersen dies.
 12 April 1984  Russell M. Nelson ordained.
 3 May 1984  Dallin H. Oaks ordained.
 19 April 1985  Bruce R. McConkie dies.
 10 October 1985  M. Russell Ballard ordained.
 5 November 1985  Spencer W. Kimball dies.
 10 November 1985  The First Presidency is reorganized, with Ezra Taft Benson as president, Gordon B. Hinckley as First Counselor, and Thomas S. Monson as Second Counselor. Marion G. Romney becomes President of the Quorum, but due to suffering from health and age difficulties, Howard W. Hunter was set apart as Acting President of the Quorum.
 9 October 1986  Joseph B. Wirthlin ordained.
 20 May 1988  Marion G. Romney dies. Howard W. Hunter becomes President of the Quorum.
 6 October 1988  Richard G. Scott ordained.

1990s
 25 February 1994  Marvin J. Ashton dies.
 2 April 1994  Robert D. Hales added to the Quorum.
 30 May 1994  Ezra Taft Benson dies.
 5 June 1994  The First Presidency is reorganized, with Howard W. Hunter as president, Gordon B. Hinckley as First Counselor, and Thomas S. Monson as Second Counselor. Hinckley becomes President of the Quorum, with Boyd K. Packer as Acting President.
 23 June 1994  Jeffrey R. Holland added to the Quorum and ordained.
 3 March 1995  Howard W. Hunter dies.
 12 March 1995  The First Presidency is reorganized, with Gordon B. Hinckley as president, Thomas S. Monson as First Counselor, and James E. Faust as Second Counselor. Monson becomes President of the Quorum, with Boyd K. Packer as Acting President.
 1 April 1995  Henry B. Eyring added to the Quorum.

2000s
 21 July 2004  Neal A. Maxwell dies.
 31 July 2004  David B. Haight dies.
 2 October 2004  Dieter F. Uchtdorf and David A. Bednar added to Quorum.
 10 August 2007  James E. Faust dies.
 6 October 2007  Henry B. Eyring sustained as Second Counselor in the First Presidency; Quentin L. Cook added to Quorum
 27 January 2008  Gordon B. Hinckley dies. 
 3 February 2008  The First Presidency is reorganized, with Thomas S. Monson as President, Henry B. Eyring as First Counselor, and Dieter F. Uchtdorf as Second Counselor. Boyd K. Packer becomes President of the Quorum.
 5 April 2008  D. Todd Christofferson added to Quorum.
 1 December 2008  Joseph B. Wirthlin dies.
 4 April 2009  Neil L. Andersen added to Quorum.

2010s
 30 May 2015  L. Tom Perry dies.
 3 July 2015  Boyd K. Packer dies. Russell M. Nelson becomes President of the Quorum (set apart on 15 July).
 22 September 2015  Richard G. Scott dies. 
 3 October 2015  Ronald A. Rasband, Gary E. Stevenson, and Dale G. Renlund added to Quorum.
 1 October 2017  Robert D. Hales dies.
 2 January 2018  Thomas S. Monson dies.
 14 January 2018  The First Presidency is reorganized, with Russell M. Nelson as President, Dallin H. Oaks as First Counselor, and Henry B. Eyring as Second Counselor. Oaks is set apart as President of the Quorum, with M. Russell Ballard as Acting President.
 31 March 2018  Gerrit W. Gong and Ulisses Soares added to the Quorum.

Chart

Timeline

See also

Chronology of the First Presidency (LDS Church)
List of members of the Quorum of the Twelve Apostles (LDS Church)
List of presidents of the Church of Jesus Christ of Latter-day Saints
President of the Church (LDS Church)
Apostolic succession (LDS Church)

Notes

Chronology
Quorum of Twelve
Quorum of the Twelve Apostles, Chronology
Quorum of the Twelve Apostles, Chronology
 Chronology
Quorum of the Twelve Apostles (LDS Church)
Quorum of the Twelve Apostles Chronology